This article lists the heads of state of Malta, from independence as the State of Malta in 1964 to present.

From 1964 to 1974, Malta was a Commonwealth realm and its head of state under the Constitution of Malta was the Queen of Malta, Elizabeth II – who was also simultaneously the Queen of the United Kingdom and the other Commonwealth realms. She was represented in Malta by a governor-general. Malta became a republic within the Commonwealth after constitutional amendments in 1974, and the position of monarch and governor-general were replaced by the President of Malta who is indirectly elected.

Queen of Malta (1964–1974)

The succession to the throne was the same as the succession to the British throne.

Governors-General of Malta
The Governor-General of Malta was the representative of the monarch in Malta and exercised most of the powers of the monarch. The Governor-General was appointed for an indefinite term, serving at the pleasure of the Monarch. After the passage of the Statute of Westminster 1931, the Governor-General was appointed solely on the advice of the Cabinet of Malta without the involvement of the British government. In the event of a vacancy the Chief Justice served as Officer Administering the Government.

Status

Presidents of the Republic of Malta (1974–present)

Under the Constitution of Malta as amended in 1974, the position of President of Malta replaced the British Monarch as head of state. The position of President is elected by Parliament for a five-year term. As from 1989, the President is traditionally inaugurated on April 4th of the year of the nomination and subsequent election of the President by Parliament, provided the preceding President has not resigned before their term expired. In the event of a vacancy, or for any reason the President is unable to perform the functions conferred upon them by the Constitution, those functions are performed by an Acting President appointed by the Prime Minister, after consultation with the Leader of the Opposition. If there is no person in Malta so appointed and able to perform those functions, the Chief Justice serves as Acting President. 

Political parties

Other factions

Status

Standards

See also
 List of governors of Malta
 List of prime ministers of Malta

External links
 World Statesmen – Malta
 Rulers.org – Malta

Government of Malta
Head

Malta
Heads of state